The network and service management taxonomy serves as a classification system for research on the management of computer networks and the services provided by computer networks. The taxonomy has been created and is being maintained by a joint effort of the Flamingo FP7 Project and the Committee of Network Operations and Management (CNOM) of the Communications Society (COMSOC) of the Institute of Electrical and Electronics Engineers (IEEE) and the Working Group 6.6 of the International Federation of Information Processing (IFIP). The taxonomy is organized into seven categories. The first four categories identify what kind of network/service/business aspect is being managed and which functional areas are covered. The remaining three categories identify which management paradigms, technologies, and methods are used.

Category #1: Network Management 

The first category called "Network Management" addresses the following question: What kind of network is being managed?

 IP networks
 Wireless and Cellular Networks
 Virtual networks
 Home networks
 Access networks
 Fog and Edge Networks
 Wide Area Networks
 Enterprise and campus networks
 Data center networks
 Industrial Networks
 Vehicular Networks
 Internet of Things and Sensor Networks 
 Information-centric networks

Category #2: Service Management 

The second category called "Service Management" addresses the following question: What kind of service is being managed?

 Multimedia services
 Content delivery services
 Cloud computing services
 Internet connectivity and access services
 Internet of Things services
 Security Services
 Context-Aware Services
 Information technology services
 Service Assurance

Category #3: Business Management 

The third category called "Business Management" addresses the following question: How does management relate to business aspects?

 Economic Aspects
 Multi-Stakeholder Aspects
 Service Level Agreements
 Lifecycle Aspect
 Process and Workflow Aspects
 Legal Perspective
 Regulatory Perspective
 Privacy Aspects
 Organizational Aspect

Category #4: Functional Areas 

The fourth category "Functional Areas" addresses the following question: Which functional areas are covered? The functional areas originated from the ISO Telecommunications Management Network model and framework for network management.

 Fault management
 Configuration management
 Accounting management
 Performance management
 Security management

Category #5: Management Paradigms 

The fifth category "Management Paradigms" addresses the following question: Which paradigm is used to achieve network and service management?

 Centralized Management
 Hierarchical Management
 Distributed Management
 Federated Management
 Autonomic and cognitive management
 Policy- and Intent-Based Management 
 Model-Driven Management
 Pro-active Management
 Energy-aware Management
 QoE-Centric Management

Category #6: Technologies 

The sixth category "Technologies" addresses the following question: Which technologies are used in the management process?

 Communication protocols
 Middleware
 Overlay networks
 Peer-to-Peer Networks
 Cloud Computing and Cloud Storage
 Data, Information and Semantic Models
 Information visualization
 Software-defined networking
 Network function virtualization
 Orchestration
 Operations and business support systems
 Control and Data Plane Programmability 
 Distributed Ledger Technology

Category #7: Methods 

The seventh category "Methods" addresses the following question: What are the methods used to address the management problem?

 Mathematical logic and automated reasoning
 Optimization Theories
 Control theory
 Probability theory, stochastic processes, and queuing theory
 Artificial Intelligence and Machine Learning
 Evolutionary algorithms
 Economic theory and game theory
 Monitoring and measurements
 Data mining and (big) data analysis
 Computer simulation experiments
 Testbed Experimentation and Field Trials
 Software Engineering Methodologies

See also
 ACM Computing Classification System
 Taxonomy (general)

References

Taxonomy